Weinkauffia is a genus of gastropods belonging to the family Haminoeidae.

The genus has almost cosmopolitan distribution.

Species:

Weinkauffia lacrimula 
Weinkauffia macandrewii 
Weinkauffia perforata 
Weinkauffia reliqua 
Weinkauffia tremens 
Weinkauffia turgidula 
Weinkauffia ukulele

References

Gastropods